Masters from Different Worlds is an album by saxophonist Clifford Jordan and pianist Ran Blake with trombonist Julian Priester which was recorded in 1989 and released on the Mapleshade label in 1994.

Track listing

Personnel
Clifford Jordan – tenor saxophone, soprano saxophone (tracks 1–3, 6, 8 & 9)
Ran Blake – piano
Julian Priester – trombone (tracks 2, 3 & 5)
Windmill Saxophone Quartet: (tracks 2 & 8)
Jesse Meman – alto saxophone
Tom Monroe, Ken Plant – tenor saxophone
Clayton Englar – baritone saxophone
Steve Williams – drums (tracks 2, 4, 5 & 10)
Alfredo Mojica – congas (track 2)
Claudia Polley – vocals (track 5 & 8)

References

Clifford Jordan albums
Ran Blake albums
1994 albums
Mapleshade Records albums